Bakal may refer to:

Places
Bakal, Bangladesh, a village in the Barisal Division of Bangladesh
Bakal, Mali, a village in Gao Region, Mali
Bakal, Russia, a town in Satkinsky District of Chelyabinsk Oblast, Russia
Pakal, Markazi, a village in Markazi Province, Iran, alternately spelled Bākal
Bakal mine, an iron mine in Chelyabinsk Oblast, Russia

Other uses
Greek general stores in Egypt
Captain Bakal, a fictional character in Dragonlance

People
David Bakal (b. 1989), American soccer player
Inbar Bakal, Israeli singer and songwriter
Sylvia Young, born Sylvia Bakal (b. 1939), founder of Sylvia Young Theatre School in the UK

See also
Baykal (disambiguation)
Bakaly